Vehicle inspection is a procedure mandated by national or subnational governments in many countries, in which a vehicle is inspected to ensure that it conforms to regulations governing safety, emissions, or both.  Inspection can be required at various times, e.g., periodically or on transfer of title to a vehicle.  If required periodically, it is often termed periodic motor vehicle inspection; typical intervals are every two years and every year.

In some jurisdictions, proof of inspection is required before a vehicle licence or license plate can be issued or renewed.  In others, once a vehicle passes inspection, a decal is attached to the windshield, and police can enforce the inspection law by seeing whether the vehicle displays an up-to-date decal.  In the case of a vehicle lacking a windshield (e.g., a trailer or motorcycle), the decal is typically attached to the vehicle body.

With regard to safety inspection, there has been some controversy over whether it is a cost-effective way to improve road-traffic safety.

Australia 

Each Australian State has the authority to set its own laws pertaining to vehicle inspections. Most jurisdictions have some form of safety and/or emissions inspection, although Western Australia does not.

New South Wales
Vehicles over five years old are required to obtain an e-Safety Check prior to registration renewal, on a yearly basis. Inspections are done at appropriately licensed mechanics.

Queensland
Queensland Transport requires any vehicle to have a safety inspection (and the resulting Safety Certificate prominently displayed) before it can be offered for sale or have its interstate registration transferred. The inspection checks the general condition of the vehicle itself (suspension, body condition, etc...) and certain items of basic safety equipment such as the tyres, brakes, lights, windshield, etc... The certificate is valid for 1,000 km or 3 months (whichever is sooner) if the vehicle is being offered for sale by a dealer, and for 2,000 km or 2 months if being sold by an individual. There are some exceptions, vehicles being sold in rural parts of the state are exempt if driving to the nearest inspection station would present a hardship, and vehicles that are only being sold for parts likewise do not requirer a safety inspection. Sellers who are required to have a safety certificate but either do not obtain one or fail to display it properly while the vehicle is advertised for sale are subject to an AU$375 on the spot fine.

There are no periodic safety inspections in Queensland once a vehicle is registered, however, mobile road teams conduct random emissions inspections through a program called OVERT, and drivers may be summoned if their vehicles are not within legal guidelines or emits visible smoke.

Victoria
Similar to Queensland, VicRoads requires that a vehicle being sold, registered from interstate have a current Certificate of Roadworthiness from a licensed vehicle inspector. Additionally, vehicles that are cited by the police for safety defects must also obtain a certificate.

Americas

Canada
Safety testing regulations vary through the different provinces.  In Manitoba for example, upon buying a car (new or used), a valid safety check must be done before it can be registered.  Dealerships are required to provide the buyer with a new safety, while private sellers are not (if a private seller so chooses, they may pay for, and issue a new safety in order to make it more appealing to buy).  In either case, if the vehicle bought has not had a safety test within the last year, the buyer must safety the vehicle before it can be registered with autopac. From the point the car is registered, no safety test is required as long as the car remains with the current owner (however, if something goes wrong, automechanics and dealerships have the right to refuse to let the client drive out with an unsafe car).

The province of Prince Edward Island requires annual safety inspections. Nova Scotia and New Brunswick require a safety every 2 years.

United States
In the United States, each state government is free to decide whether to require vehicle safety inspection, as well as the specifics of the inspection program.  Not all states require it, most do not; some states that used to require it have discontinued it.

Under the Clean Air Act (1990), states are required to implement vehicle emission inspection programs in metropolitan areas whose air quality does not meet federal standards.  The specifics of those programs vary from state to state. Some states, including Kentucky and Minnesota, have discontinued their testing programs in recent years with approval from the federal government.

States and Federal Districts with periodic (e.g., annual) vehicle safety inspections 
 Delaware (every year or every two years; brand new cars are exempt for the first four years provided the car remains with the same owner. Older cars registered as antiques do not require emissions testing.) 
 District of Columbia (every year for commercial and for-hire vehicles)
 Hawaii (every year, except brand new vehicles receive an inspection valid for two years, ambulances, rental cars, vehicles used in public transportation, and other, every six months)
 Louisiana (every year; emission test in the Baton Rouge metropolitan area)
 Maine (every year; emission test in Cumberland County)
 Massachusetts (safety and emissions annually, cars manufactured prior to model year 1996 are not subject to emissions testing.)
 Missouri (every two years; emissions testing in the St. Louis area)
 New Hampshire (every year, emissions testing for vehicles equipped with OBD-II (model year 1996 and newer) )
 New Jersey (safety and emissions testing every two years, brand new cars are exempt for the first four years provided the car remains with the same owner. Older cars registered as antiques do not require emissions testing.)
 New York (safety and emissions test every year, method of emissions testing varies by county of registration: tail pipe emissions testing in New York City as well as the counties of Nassau, Suffolk, Westchester and Rockland, OBD-II emissions testing in upstate counties)
 North Carolina (every year; emissions inspections in 48 of 100 counties (1996-newer, except new cars), exempting diesels and cars 35 years or older. Starting Nov 1, 2008 there won't be an inspection decal issued upon passing.)
 Pennsylvania(every year for most vehicles; every six months for tractor-trailers, school vehicles (including school buses and school vans), motor coaches, mass transit, ambulances, firetrucks, etc.; emissions inspections every year in 25 of 67 counties (no emission inspection for diesel vehicles))annual inspection, emission, and semi-annual inspection stickers are color-coded, which tells which year they expire. This makes it easier for police to track down expired stickers. 
 Rhode Island (safety and emission inspection every two years)
 Tennessee does not have a statewide mandate on emissions testing. Several Tennessee counties including Hamilton, Williamson, Rutherford, Sumner, and Wilson formally ended their vehicle inspection programs as of January 2022. Davidson County ended its program in February 2022. 
 Texas (every year; emission test in the largest urban areas - Houston Metro, Dallas Metroplex, Austin, San Antonio, and El Paso)
 Utah (every two years for the first eight years, then every year)
 Vermont (every year)
 Virginia (every year; emission inspection every two years in urban and suburban jurisdictions in Northern Virginia)
 West Virginia (every year - safety)

States with safety inspection only required prior to sale or transfer 
 Maryland (emission inspection required biennially)

States and Federal Districts which only require federally mandated emissions inspections 
 Alaska (Municipality of Anchorage and Fairbanks North Star Borough) every two years, depending on age and type of vehicle
 Arizona (Phoenix and Tucson metro areas only) annually, depending on age and type of vehicle )
 California (for most ZIP Codes, every two years for all vehicles made after 1975 which are more than six years old)
 Colorado (in some localities, every year or two, depending on age and type of vehicle )
 Connecticut (every two years)
 District of Columbia (every two years for personal vehicles, except that vehicles registered as new are exempt for the first four years)
 Georgia (metropolitan Atlanta area only, every year, most recent three model year cars are exempt)
 Illinois (Chicago metropolitan area and eastern suburbs of St. Louis, Missouri)
 Indiana (Lake and Porter counties only, every two years)
 New Mexico (Albuquerque metro area)
 Nevada (Clark County and Washoe County areas)
 Ohio (Cuyahoga, Geauga, Lake, Lorain, Medina, Portage, and Summit counties only)
 Oregon (Portland and Medford metro areas only) 
 Washington (urban areas of Clark, King, Pierce, Snohomish and Spokane counties)
 Wisconsin (Kenosha, Milwaukee, Ozaukee, Racine, Sheyboygan, Washington and Waukesha; every two years)

Europe 
The European Union Council directive 96/96/EC of 20 December 1996 mandates all its member states to carry out periodic safety and emission inspections for most types of motor vehicles. It also sets minimum requirements for those inspections and their intervals. For light commercial vehicles (up to 3.5 t) and private cars (up to 8 seats) the first inspection shall occur no later than 4 years and at a frequency of up to 2 years thereafter. All other types of vehicles shall be subject to yearly inspection (busses, vans, trucks, trailers, taxis, ambulances, coaches). Vehicles from the military and fire departments are exempted from the directive.

Austria

In Austria, all vehicles must undergo a "Wiederkehrende Begutachtung nach § 57a KFG" (recurring inspection following section 57a of the motor vehicle statute). A decal is placed on the vehicle's windscreen (usually the upper right-hand corner), hence the inspection itself is colloquially referred to as "Pickerl" (literally: sticker). The color of the decal is white for vehicles with a catalytic converter, and green for vehicles without one. Punch holes indicate the month and year that the next inspection is due. However, the inspection can be carried out one month in advance of that date and up to four months after the one indicated on the decal. (The vehicle remains roadworthy during that time). Unless the inspection is overdue in the sense described above, the roadworthiness certificate is transferable, meaning a new owner will get a new decal with the same date, but the corrected license plate number upon registration of the vehicle. However, not merely the old decal, but also the latest official inspection report will have to be presented for this purpose.

The first inspection on new passenger cars is required after three years, another one two years on, while thereafter passenger cars must pass the official inspection each and every year to remain roadworthy. Heavy trucks and motorcycles must undergo annual inspections from the very first year. Inspections are carried out by specially licensed garages and by Austria's two major automotive clubs. The Austrian motor vehicle inspection covers both aspects of vehicle safety and emissions standards.

Finland
Finland has a long tradition of vehicle inspection, dating back to year 1917. Vehicle inspection was initially carried by cities and provincial inspectors but starting from year 1968 the inspection moved to national governing body of road vehicle administration known as Autorekisterikeskus. In 1994 the vehicle inspection was opened for competition and in 1996 Autorekisterikeskus was split as administrative body Ajoneuvohallintokeskus (AKE) and inspection company Suomen Autokatsastus Oy. Nowadays, Ajoneuvohallintokeskus governs the inspection companies and keeps track of inspection quality and the inspections are carried by private companies. During the years, the inspection procedures and facilities have improved greatly and nowadays the quality of inspection is on such level that mechanical failures as immediate cause for fatal crashes in the whole country are minimal.

In Finland, the Määräaikaiskatsastus (periodic inspection) is required for all passenger cars, vans, trucks, ATVs and for trailers with maximum structural weight of more than 750 kilograms. First inspection for passenger cars is 4 years after the car has been registered, then every other year until the car is 10 years old, after that it has to be inspected every year. Classic cars are inspected every 4 years.

The periodic inspection includes verification of vehicle register information (VIN, taxes, insurance) test drive, brake testing, inspection of lights and compulsory equipment, superficial inspection for visibility and handling hindrances and bodywork, undercarriage inspection for suspension parts and corrosion and emission measurements (requirements vary depending on propellant and date of first deployment). The emission measurement can be taken on a registered repair shop prior to the inspection. If done so, a proper measurement certificate must be shown at inspection. Upon passed inspection, a new "Part one" of registration certificate is printed and handed to customer among with inspection report. If inspection fails, the faults found during the inspection must be repaired and the vehicle needs to be shown at the same inspection station for a Jälkitarkastus (recheck) within one month of the inspection.

Germany

Germany introduced mandatory vehicle roadworthiness inspections in 1951. In Germany the VI is called Hauptuntersuchung (literally: main inspection), in reference to the main technical inspection company in Western Germany, often called TÜV. A safety inspection and an emission inspection are required to be done by one of the authorized private technical inspection companies (e.g. TÜV, DEKRA, KÜS, GTÜ, ...) every 2 years for passenger cars, motorcycles, light trucks and light trailers. New passenger cars and very light trailers have to pass their first roadworthiness check after 3 years; motorcycles, light trucks, mid-weight trailers and camper trailers after 2 years.
Commercial vehicles (trucks and heavy trailers with an unladen mass over 3.5 tonnes, buses, taxis and also rental cars) are to be checked every year.
A round safety inspection decal shows the next due inspection (year in the middle, month at the top) and is placed on the rear license plate; a similar hexagonal emission inspection decal was placed on the front license plate until 2010, when it was phased out as the emission inspection became part of the safety inspection.
Many inspections in Germany take place in garages, preparing vehicle for that. An inspector of one of the authorized inspection companies visits the garage, typically once or twice a week. The garage needs facilities for brake, light and environment pollution tests.

Ireland
In Ireland, the National Car Test (NCT) is required for cars 4 or more years of age to be inspected for various items, such as brakes, lighting, bodywork condition, emissions, etc. A disc which must be displayed on the windscreen is issued to cars that pass the test. The disc is valid for two years, after which the car must then be re-tested. If the car is more than 10 years old, testing is yearly. Vintage cars over 40 years old are exempt. Car testing is carried out in dedicated NCT centres which is a private firm who won a government tender. New tests now cover OBD errors.

Romania
In Romania, vehicle inspection is carried out by approved centers linked to the RAR (Registrul Auto Român) database. Such inspection is called ITP (Inspecția tehnică periodică) and it checks for emissions and safety (usually every year). Upon a successful check, a sticker along with expiry date and other reference numbers are affixed on the Registration Certificate (Certificat de înmatriculare).

Spain

The "Inspección Técnica de Vehículos" (ITV) is mandatory for vehicles such as motorbikes, cars, vans, lorries and buses.

The Netherlands
In The Netherlands the "Algemene Periodieke Keuring" (APK) or General Periodical Inspection is mandatory for vehicles aging 4 years for the first inspection. Then after 2 years and another 2 years. Once the vehicle is 8 years old, the mandatory APK inspection interval becomes yearly, until the vehicle is 50 years old. After that, the vehicle is exempt. The inspections scrutinize and enforce conformity to both safety and emissions standards.

United Kingdom

The Ministry of Transport test (more usually: MOT - pronounced by spelling out the letters) is a mandatory annual test of safety, roadworthiness and exhaust emissions for vehicles over three years old.

Sweden

In Sweden Svensk Bilprovning AB had a monopoly on vehicle inspections until June 30, 2010. In 2021 the five largest companies, accounting for more than 99% of the market shares, were Svensk Bilprovning, Besikta, Opus, Carspect and DEKRA. For cars classified as veteran/classic cars (currently occurring when the car reaches age 30), inspection is every 2 years. For modern cars the first inspection is after the vehicle becomes 3 years old, which after it has to be inspected after 2 years. From that moment an inspection has to be done yearly.

Asia

Korea
Korea Transportation Safety Authority(TS) owns the approval and operation of the Vehicle inspections. Regular inspection, Overall inspection, intermittent inspection, New vehicle inspection and Taxi meter verification are the category for the vehicles in Korea.

Japan

Under the Japanese shaken (車検) program, when a vehicle turns 3 years old, it must get an inspection every two years.

China
Chinese Rural Vehicle (CRV) operators can be subject to fine by authorities (police) if the vehicle emits visible smoke. Regulations are administered by province/economic region/city as appropriate. New vehicles must pass regulations (Euro spec) in effect on the day of manufacture. CRVs are responsible for about half of all vehicle emissions in the PRC.

See also 
 Automobile safety

References

External links
 CITA-Vehicle Inspection
 NRMA

Automotive safety
Emissions reduction
Road transport
 

sv:Besiktning